Tiszaföldvár is a town in Jász-Nagykun-Szolnok county, in the Northern Great Plain region of central Hungary.

Geography

Politics
The current mayor of Tiszaföldvár is István Hegedűs (Independent).

The local Municipal Assembly, elected at the 2019 local government elections, is made up of 12 members (1 Mayor, 8 Individual constituencies MEPs and 3 Compensation List MEPs) divided into this political parties and alliances:

Twin towns – sister cities

Tiszaföldvár is twinned with:
 Bačko Gradište (Bečej), Serbia (2006)
 Gräfenberg, Germany (2003)
 Hérimoncourt, France (2004)
 Mielec, Poland (2006)

Tiszaföldvár also cooperates with other Hungarian municipalities with "földvár" in their names: Balatonföldvár, Dunaföldvár and Pusztaföldvár.

Gallery

References

External links

 in Hungarian, English, German and French

Populated places in Jász-Nagykun-Szolnok County